Allapra is a town in Kunnathunad Taluk of Ernakulam district in the Indian state of Kerala. It is on Perumbavoor-Kolenchery road. It is a junction where road to Thuruthipilly meet Perumbavoor-Kolenchery road.

Religious places
Valakkara Devi Temple Allapra
Naklikkattu Kalari Temple
Sree Subramaniya Temple Allapra
Naklikkattu Naga Paradevatha Temple 
Cholla kavu Allapra
Muthiramali Devi Temple 
St:Jacob Church Allapra

Location

References 

Cities and towns in Ernakulam district